Pino-Tronzano railway station is a railway station in the comune of Maccagno con Pino e Veddasca, in the Italian region of Lombardy. It is an intermediate stop on the standard gauge Cadenazzo–Luino line of Rete Ferroviaria Italiana and is final station south of the border between Switzerland and Italy.

Services 
 the following services stop at Pino-Tronzano:

References

External links 
 
 

Buildings and structures in the Province of Varese
Railway stations in Lombardy